Avar in Iran may refer to:
Avar, Qazvin
Avar, Razavi Khorasan
Avar, Tehran